The Heart of America Rugby Football Union is a college rugby conference playing in Division I-AA, with membership composed mostly of Big 12, Big Ten and SEC schools (and many of these schools enjoying longstanding rivalries from the former Big Eight Conference).  HOA organizes a league competition with the winner qualifying for the national playoffs, and every fall hosts a rugby sevens tournament with the winner qualifying for the national sevens championships.

Heart of America was a Division 2 conference until 2011, with Arkansas and Missouri ranked among the top teams in Division 2. In summer 2011, however, with the creation of the Premier College Division (Division I-A), several conferences including HOA decided to move up to Division I-AA.

The HOA conference is led by Conference Commissioner Bill Sexton of Truman State University.

Current members 
The current member schools (and the date they joined the conference) are:

Member notes:
 Lindenwood joined HOA summer of 2012.  Lindenwood was the Division 2 champion in 2011–12, and was promoted to Division I-AA for the 2012-13 year.
 Iowa State joined HOA summer of 2012. Iowa State played in the D1-AA Midwest conference until summer 2012, and joined HOA when the majority of the Midwest conference teams joined the newly formed Big Ten rugby conference.
 Former member Central Missouri left the conference in summer 2012 to play in the Division 2 Gateway Collegiate Rugby Conference.
 Former member Lindenwood left the HOA conference during the summer of 2013 to play in the Division I-A Mid/South conference.
 Washington University in St. Louis joined briefly in 2016 from the Division 2 Gateway Conference, then went back to the Gateway following year.
 University of Arkansas left the summer of 2016 for the Red River Rugby Conference, and then rejoined in the summer of 2021.
 University of Nebraska joined 2015 after leaving the Big Ten Rugby Conference.
 University of Minnesota joined during the summer of 2021 after leaving the Big Ten Rugby Conference.

League results

Heart of America Sevens
The HOA sevens tournament is played every fall among the eight members of the HOA conference and a limited number of additional Division 1 schools. The winner of the HOA sevens tournament qualifies for the annual USA Rugby sevens national championship.
 
The HOA sevens tournament is one of a number of college rugby tournaments that are tapping into the increased interest of rugby sevens while also targeting traditional collegiate conference rivalries.  The HOA developed this competition due to the increasing popularity of rugby sevens throughout the United States, particularly since the 2009 announcement adding rugby sevens to the Summer Olympics, and in the wake of the success of the Collegiate Rugby Championship rugby sevens tournament broadcast live on NBC every year.

References

External links
 

College rugby conferences in the United States
1975 establishments in the United States